Megatone is a collaborative album between the Japanese experimental doom band Boris and the Japanese noise musician Merzbow.

Track listing

Notes
Recorded at Sound Square 2001, and Bedroom, Itabashi 2000–2001
Mixed and mastered at Bedroom, Itabashi 11/09/2001

Personnel
Boris with Merzbow
Masami Akita – PowerBook
Wata – guitar, E-bow, Space Echo
Takeshi – guitar, E-bow
Atsuo – feedback conduction
Production
FangsAnalSatan – design
Enju Tanahashi – executive producer

References

2002 albums
Merzbow albums
Boris (band) albums
Collaborative albums